Yeşilburç (former Teney) is a village in Niğde Province, Turkey.

Geography 

Situated in a high valley, it is surrounded by fruit gardens. The population of the village is 499  as of 2020.

History 

Yeşilburç was a Karamanlides village; i.e., the residents were Turkish speakers of Orthodox Christian faith. But during the compulsory population exchange between Greece and Turkey in 1920s, they were deported to Greece just like the Greeks. In Greece they were settled in Corfu island (in Ionian Sea, west of Greece) . Meanwhile Turks from the village of Kivotos in Grevena (north Greece) who were deported from Greece came to Turkey to find a new home. They were settled in Yeşilburç in 1926.

Economy 

Fruits are the main products of Yeşilburç. The village is especially specialised in apple production. The touristic potential is also high for there are many historical buildings (from Karamanlides) in the village. But at the present tourism plays no role in the village economy

References

Villages in Niğde Province
Niğde Central District